Linda Olivier (born 17 April 1965) is a South African former cricketer who played as a right-handed batter She appeared in 28 One Day Internationals for South Africa between 1997 and 2000. She captained the side on their tours of Australia and New Zealand in 1999. She was the first South African woman to score a century in a One Day International, making 101* against Ireland in December 2000. She played domestic cricket for Gauteng and Northerns.

References

External links
 
 

1965 births
Living people
Cricketers from Free State (province)
South African women cricketers
South Africa women One Day International cricketers
South Africa women's national cricket team captains
Central Gauteng women cricketers
Northerns women cricketers